Dige is a town in the south of Shandong province, People's Republic of China, bordering Jiangsu province to the south, and located in the southeast corner of Zaozhuang City. In March 2001, the former Ganlugou Township was merged into the town's administrative area.

References

Township-level divisions of Shandong